John R. Burden was an English professional footballer. A left back, he played 34 Football League games for Blackpool, his only known club, in 1900 and 1901. Thirty of these appearances were made during the 1900–01 season; the other four in the following campaign.

References

Year of birth missing
Year of death missing
English footballers
Blackpool F.C. players
Association football fullbacks